The FIVB Beach Volleyball U17 World Championship is a double-gender international beach volleyball tournament for athletes under the age of 17. The competition first took place in Acapulco, Mexico in 2014.

Results summary

Men

Women

Medals table

References

U17 World Championships, Mexico 2014

Recurring sporting events established in 2014
U17
Beach
World youth sports competitions
Youth volleyball